The Wilno Voivodeship was one of 16 Voivodeships in the Second Polish Republic, with the capital in Wilno (now Vilnius, Lithuania). The jurisdiction was created in 1926 and populated predominantly by Poles, with notable minorities of Belarusians, Jews and Lithuanians. Before 1926, the voivodeship's area was known as the Wilno Land; it had the same boundaries and was also within the contemporary borders of Poland at the time.

Following the German and Soviet invasion of Poland and the reshaping of Europe, Poland's borders were redrawn at the insistence of Soviet leader Joseph Stalin at the Tehran Conference. Wilno Voivodeship was incorporated into the Lithuanian and the Byelorussian Soviet Socialist Republics. Many of the ethnic Polish population were forcibly resettled at the end of World War II. Since 1991, the former territory of the voivodeship is now part of sovereign Lithuania and sovereign Belarus.

History

Background 
After the Third Partition of Poland–Lithuania in 1795, the Vilnius region, like most of Grand Duchy of Lithuania, was occupied by the Russian Empire until World War I. Russian rule in the region was unstable as evidenced by the French invasion of Russia, the Uprisings of 1831 and 1863. In the aftermath of World War I and Russia's internal weakness due to the Russian Civil War, Lithuania and Poland re-established their independence. However, the Polish–Lithuanian War began as a result of conflict between two countries. In October 1920, Józef Piłsudski, Poland's Chief of State, in order to circumvent the Treaty of Suvalkai, which left Vilnius on the Lithuanian side, organized Żeligowski's Mutiny, to seize Vilnius for Poland. In this false flag operation, the Polish goals of taking over Vilnius were achieved and the Polish puppet state of Central Lithuania was created. In 1922, after a disputed election to the Vilnius Sejm, the parliament voted to incorporate Central Lithuania into the Second Polish Republic.

1920s and 1930s 
From 6 April 1922 to 20 January 1926, the territory was known as the Wilno Land. Wilno Voivodeship was created on 20 January 1926 from the territories of the Wilno Land. It was formed as the last of the Polish voivodeships in the interbellum. (The Sandomierz Voivodeship was supposed to be created in late 1939, but never was).

World War II 
Following the Soviet invasion in 1939, the Wilno Voivodeship was divided between the newly created Vileyka Voblast of the Byelorussian SSR and independent Lithuania (from 1940 this was known as the Lithuanian SSR). This division was not internationally accepted. The Polish government-in-exile nominated  in 1942 as its representative for Wilno region. He was arrested by the NKVD in 1944.

Currently the former territory of Wilno Voivodeship is divided between the Vilnius and Utena counties in Lithuania and the Grodno, Minsk and Vitebsk Regions of Belarus.

Location
The Wilno Voivodeship had an area of 29,011 km2 (which made it the fourth biggest Polish Voivodeship) and a population (according to the Polish census of 1931) - of 1,276,000.

The Voivodeship was located in the country's northeastern corner, bordering Soviet Union to the east, Lithuania to the west, Latvia to the north, Nowogródek Voivodeship to the south and Białystok Voivodeship to the south-west. The landscape was flat and hilly in parts, with several lakes (such as Narocz, the biggest lake in interwar Poland). As of 1 January 1937, 21.2% of the area was forested (with the national average of 22.2%).

Towns and administrative division 
Wilno Voivodeship was created after the territory of the Republic of Central Lithuania was merged with the so-called Wilno Area. In the years 1922–1939 it was divided into 9 powiats (counties):

In 1931, the biggest city of the Voivodeship (and the biggest in northeastern Poland) was Wilno, with 195 100 inhabitants. Apart from this city, Voivodeship was sparsely populated and lacked more urban centres. All other towns were very small, none of them reached a population larger than 10 000 (as of 1931).

Population

According to the Polish census of 1931 the Voivodeship was inhabited by 1,276,000 people. Majority of population was Polish (59.7% claimed Polish as their native tongue). Among minorities there were: Belarusians (22.7%),  Jews (8.5%), Lithuanians (5.5%) and Russians (3.4%). The population density was 44 persons per km2 (second lowest in Poland, after Polesie Voivodeship). The census has been criticized as inaccurate due to bias against the Belarusians and Lithuanians.

Following the Polish territorial changes after World War II, a significant part of the Polish population was repatriated to the newly formed People's Republic of Poland as Wilno Voivodeship was split and incorporated into the Lithuanian and Byelorussian Soviet Socialist Republics. Many encountered difficulties in the repatriation process and were prevented from leaving. The Polish population that remained in Lithuania was subjected to attempts at Lithuanization (in the 1950s), which were thwarted by Moscow, and to Russification and Sovietization policies.

Industry and transport
Wilno Voivodeship was located in the so-called Poland "B", which meant that it was still underdeveloped, apart from the city of Wilno. A large part of the population was poor, with a high level of illiteracy (in 1931, 29.1% was illiterate, with the national average of 23.1%). Railway network was scarce, with only a few junctions - the most important one at Wilno, also at Molodeczno,  and Nowa Wilejka. The total length of railroads within Voivodeship's boundaries was 1,097 kilometres, which was only 3.8 per 100 km2.

Elektrit Radiotechnical Society was the largest privately owned company in Wilno. With over 1,100 workers, the society produced around 50,000 radio receivers annually.

Voivodes
Government delegates
, 4 February 1922 – 6 April 1922
Walery Roman, 6 April 1922 – 29 August 1924
Władysław Raczkiewicz, 29 August 1924 – 14 June 1925
Olgierd Malinowski, 22 December 1925 – 25 May 1926 (acting)

Voivodes
Władysław Raczkiewicz, 18 May 1926 – 20 June 1931
, 20 December 1930 – 20 June 1931
, 20 June 1931 – 27 January 1933
Marian Styczniakowski, 27 January 1933 – 16 February 1933 (acting)
, 16 February 1933 – 13 October 1935
Marian Styczniakowski, 14 October 1935 – 4 October 1935 (acting)
, 4 December 1935 – 19 May 1939
, 19 May 1939 – 18 September 1939

See also
 Vilnius
 Vilnius Region
 Republic of Central Lithuania
 Russian Empire's Vilna Governorate

References

Further reading
 
  Maly Rocznik Statystyczny, Warszawa 1939 (Concise Statistical Year-Book of Poland, Warsaw 1939).

 
Former voivodeships of the Second Polish Republic
History of Vilnius
1920s in Lithuania
1930s in Lithuania
Western Belorussia (1918–1939)